Mohamad Azlan bin Iskandar (born 1 June 1982, in Kuching, Sarawak), known as Mohd Azlan Iskandar, is a Malaysian squash player. He has reached the World No. 10 ranking and won the Kuala Lumpur Open and the Malaysian Open.

Career overview
With a career high of 10 in the Professional Squash Association rankings. Azlan is currently ranked 10th in the PSA table.

External links 
 
 
 
 

1982 births
Living people
Malaysian male squash players
Commonwealth Games competitors for Malaysia
Squash players at the 2010 Commonwealth Games
Asian Games medalists in squash
Asian Games gold medalists for Malaysia
Asian Games silver medalists for Malaysia
Asian Games bronze medalists for Malaysia
Squash players at the 2002 Asian Games
Squash players at the 2006 Asian Games
Squash players at the 2010 Asian Games
Squash players at the 2014 Asian Games
Medalists at the 2002 Asian Games
Medalists at the 2006 Asian Games
Medalists at the 2010 Asian Games
Medalists at the 2014 Asian Games
World Games bronze medalists
Competitors at the 2009 World Games
People from Sarawak
Southeast Asian Games medalists in squash
Southeast Asian Games gold medalists for Malaysia
Competitors at the 2001 Southeast Asian Games